Dana Goldberg (born March 1, 1979) is an Israeli poet, filmmaker and playwright.

Biography
Goldberg was born in Herzliya. Her father was a pilot and her mother worked at a bank. As a child, she studied many different creative fields: photography, music, plastic art, and writing. After high school, she studied at HaMidrasha – Faculty of the Arts and at Beit Berl College, while also beginning her path as a poet. Her work was published in literary journals, first in HaMe'orer and then others, including Iton 77, Helicon, and Shebo, and she was on the editorial board of the online poetry journal Anonymous Fish?. Her first collection, Orange Coral, was published in 2011.

Beginning in 2003, Goldberg created a series of short films, including Alligator (2009), for which she won the Emerging Director award at the International Women's Film Festival In Rehovot. In 2005, she was invited to take part in the Young Talent Campus of the Berlin Film Festival. In 2012, her first full-length feature film came out, Alice, about a woman who works the night shift in a residential rehabilitation school, and spends her days sleeping. The film won three awards at the Jerusalem Film Festival, a special mention at the Rehovot International Women's Film Festival, and was selected to open the Berlin Israel Film Festival in 2014. In 2018, the film Death of a Poetess came out, which she directed and wrote together with Efrat Mishori.

While much of Goldberg's work includes romantic and sexual relationships between women, she says, "My work isn't lesbian, it is feminist and critical of the society I live in, and the community I live in...There are many other important aspects of my life as an artist and also as a lesbian."

In 2016, Goldberg and Mishori founded Kinoclan, a non-profit organization that works to promote the creation and distribution of literary and film works that give voice to women's worlds, told from women's perspectives.

In theater, Goldberg wrote the play Father, Mother, Whore, which was published in the literary journal Masmerim, and was stages in the format of "directed reading" at the Tsav Kria festival (2010). She also wrote Esti of the Pines, which was staged at the Theatronetto festival in 2014.

Awards

|-
| 2018
| Death of a Poetess
| Best Debut Film, Göteborg Film Festival
| 
| Shared with Efrat Mishori
|-
| 2017
| Death of a Poetess
| Best Israeli Feature, Jerusalem Film Festival
| 
| Shared with Efrat Mishori
|-
| 2012
| Alice
| Best Israeli Feature – Honorable Mention, Jerusalem Film Festival
| 
| Haggiag award
|-
| 2012
| Alice
| Best Screenplay, Jerusalem Film Festival
| 
| Gottlieb award
|-
| 2012
| Alice
| Best Israeli Feature, Jerusalem Film Festival
| 
| Haggiag award

Filmography

See also
 List of female film and television directors
 List of lesbian filmmakers
 List of LGBT-related films directed by women

References

External links 

 
 

1979 births
Living people
Israeli female dramatists and playwrights
Israeli female screenwriters
Israeli women film directors
Israeli women poets
Israeli lesbian writers
Israeli lesbian artists
LGBT film directors
Lesbian poets
Lesbian screenwriters
Lesbian dramatists and playwrights
Israeli LGBT poets
Israeli LGBT screenwriters
Israeli LGBT dramatists and playwrights
20th-century Israeli LGBT people
21st-century Israeli LGBT people